Robert K. Maloney, MD, MA (Oxon), is an American ophthalmologist. A former Rhodes Scholar and summa cum laude graduate of Harvard University, he completed his education at Oxford University, obtained his medical degree from the University of California, San Francisco, and Johns Hopkins Hospital. Maloney was the first surgeon in western North America to perform LASIK surgery as part of the original FDA clinical trials.

Biography
He is Clinical Professor of Ophthalmology at UCLA and director of the Maloney-Shamie Vision Institute in Los Angeles, California. Maloney has trained more than 1,000 surgeons in the use of the excimer laser and has personally performed more than 65,000 vision-correction surgeries.

He received the 2001 Lans Distinguished Award, presented by the International Society of Refractive Surgery, for his innovative contributions to the field of vision correction surgery. The American Academy of Ophthalmology awarded him the Senior Honor Award for contributions to the education of other eye surgeons and the Secretariat Award for contributions to the Academy. Named as an industry leader in Becker’s ASC Review 2010 "34 of the Best Ophthalmologists in America." Maloney has published more than 175 articles, abstracts, and reports in professional journals; has delivered more than 400 invited lectures on five continents; and has a number of patents.

Maloney's research is focused on developing new technologies for vision correction surgery, including the implantable contact lens and the light-adjustable lens implant, and on complications of vision-correction surgery. He has been a principal investigator for over twenty FDA clinical trials. 

Maloney is one of the co-founders of Focus on Independence, a non-profit organization that offers free LASIK surgery nationwide to quadriplegic patients. He is on the board of trustees of Good Samaritan Hospital, where he serves on the executive committee. He is also trustee of Children Mending Hearts, a charity that provides cultural enrichment programs for homeless children, and a trustee of Van Nuys Charities, which provides financial support for charities that serve children and the homeless.

He has appeared frequently on television as the exclusive LASIK surgeon for the ABC series Extreme Makeover. He has been interviewed by the Discovery Channel, the Learning Channel, NBC’s Extra, ABC’s 20/20 and Prime Time Live, PBS’s Life and Times, and CNN’s The World Today. He has also been featured in numerous magazines and newspapers.

References

External links
 Maloney-Shamie Vision Institute website
 ABC Television's Extreme Makeover
 episodes/2002-03/1.html episodes from the series

1958 births
Living people
American ophthalmologists
Harvard University alumni
American Rhodes Scholars
University of California, San Francisco alumni
Emory University alumni
Johns Hopkins University people
David Geffen School of Medicine at UCLA faculty